Stefan Vojislav (1034–d. 1043) was the Prince of Duklja from 1040 to 1043. Beginning in the year 1018, he served as a Byzantine governor, until 1034 when he led an unsuccessful revolt that landed him in a prison at Constantinople. He managed to escape and returned home, this time successfully gaining the independence of his statelet and expanding his rule over southern Dalmatia and its hinterland. He is the eponymous founder of the Vojislavljević dynasty.

Origin and early life 
The contemporary Byzantine writers call him either a Serb or a Dukljan (Βοϊσθλάβος ὁ Διοκλητιανός), but do not mention his genealogy, while the Chronicle of the Priest of Duklja, a posterior, more dubious source, calls him a cousin to previous ruler Jovan Vladimir (r. 990–1016). Having reached its pinnacle during the long reign of emperor Basil II, the Byzantine empire entered a steady decline following his death in 1025. This was particularly evident in the Balkans, where the elimination of the perennial Bulgarian threat combined with an insensitive taxation policy helped spur liberation movements. Vojislav the Dukljan held the title of archon, and toparch of the Dalmatian kastra of Zeta and Ston (ἦν δὲ εἰς τὰ κάστρα Δαλματίας εἰς τὴν Ζένταν καὶ εἰς τὴν Στάμνον τοπάρχης Βοϊσθλάβος ὁ Διοκλητιανός).The affairs of the Dalmatians, Serbs, Croats and others were overseen by strategoi in Niš, Skopje, Ragusa (Dubrovnik) and Dyrrhachium. Vojislav had regular meetings with Katakalon Klazomenites (Catacalon), the strategos of Ragusa, and at one occasion, kidnapped him and his party because Vojislav wanted him to be the godfather to his son Katakalon at his baptism. This shows a close relationship between native leaders and Byzantine officers in the peripheral zone of the Empire after Basil's "reconquest".

Revolts

Around 1034 (according to John Skylitzes), the Dukljans renounced Byzantine rule. Stefan Vojislav, cousin of the murdered Jovan Vladimir, organized a rebellion taking advantage of the death of the emperor Romanos III Argyros. He was defeated and imprisoned in Constantinople in 1035/1036 while his realm was put under the control of the strategos Theophilos Erotikos. In late 1037 or early 1038, he managed to break out of the prison and returned to Duklja, where he organized a new rebellion, also targeting the Serb allies of the Emperor in the neighbouring regions.

By means of guerilla tactics and the distracting effects of other uprisings, he staved off several punitive expeditions and asserted partial control over the principalities of Travunija and Zahumlje. Thus, by 1040 his state stretched in the coastal region from Ston in the north, down to his capital, Skadar, set up along the southern banks of the Skadar Lake, with other courts set up in Trebinje, Kotor and Bar.

Wars with Byzantines

1039–42
In 1039, the Byzantine Emperor Michael IV the Paphlagonian was waiting in Thessaloniki for a shipment of 10 kentenars of gold (7,200 gold nomismata) coming from his provinces in Southern Italy, but the cargo ship (galley) was wrecked off the Doclean coast due to stormy weather in the winter and the goods were taken by Vojislav, who refused to return it upon Michael's requests. The emperor, who had already retaken Dyrrhachium, became furious and sent general George Probatas to tackle Vojislav, but the Byzantine army, unfamiliar with the terrain, was ambushed in the gorges and totally defeated. Vojislav's son, Radoslav, is noted as having killed a Byzantine military commander on the battlefield. Kekaumenos, a strategos sent for Vojislav, ended up imprisoned by Vojislav and taken to Ston.

The 1040-41 Uprising of Peter Delyan, who crowned himself "Czar Peter of the Bulgarians", made another Byzantine incursion against Duklja unlikely as the Byzantines were now occupied by the Bulgarian advance.

1042

In 1042, the new emperor Constantine IX decided to attack Duklja with an army based in Dyrrhachium and the neighbouring themes. The Byzantine army under Michaelus Anastasii was defeated and Vojislav ensured a future for Duklja without imperial authority.
The battle took place in the mountainous area between Bar and Crmnica after midnight on October 7, 1042. Prior to the battle a man entered the Byzantine camp and spread false information about a huge enemy army, causing panic among the Byzantines. Stefan Vojislav, along with three of his sons, led the Dukljans into battle. They slowly moved down the hills along with shouting and blowing horns and trumpets so it would exaggerate their appearance. The Byzantines were trapped in the mountainous area, as the Dukljans blocked the passage. They caught the Byzantines unprepared and managed to cause chaos among their ranks and after heavy fighting routed the remaining Byzantine forces. Some historical records claim that two-thirds of the Byzantine army had been killed. Byzantine historian John Skylitzes (1040–1101) claimed that 60,000 Byzantines participated in the battle, but these records are considered inaccurate. Most historians agree that there were about 40,000 Byzantines. Numbers of the Serb army are unknown, but are considered to be largely inferior to the Byzantines. Voislav dispatched 50 Greeks to tell the rest about the huge victory.

1043
In 1042, the župan of Raška (a renewed subordinate title, showing Byzantine overlordship), Ban of Bosnia and Prince of Hum Ljutovid, received a large sum of imperial gold and silver for their support to overthrow Vojislav. Ljutovid led the army against Duklja in 1043 but his army was ambushed at the Klobuk hill of Konavli (then part of Travunia), by Vojislav, and defeated.

Last years
Vojislav spent the rest of his rule in peace and died in 1043. He was succeeded by his widow and their five sons - Gojislav, Predimir, Mihailo, Saganek and Radoslav. He was buried in the Church of St. Andrew in Prapratna, a town between Bar and Ulcinj. Duklja remained the center of the Serbian state, replacing (in terms of leadership) the inner regions (Raška); it held this position for a few decades, under the rule of his son Mihailo I in Duklja while the other regions were later united under Vukan I of Serbia.

Titles
"archon, and toparch of the Dalmatian kastra of Zeta and Ston", his Byzantine title, according to the Strategikon of Kekaumenos (1075–78).
"Prince of the Serbs" (ὁ τῶν Σέρβων ἄρχων), according to John Skylitzes (fl. 1057–59).
"Prince of Serbia", according to George Kedrenos (fl. 1050s).

See also

List of Serbian rulers
House of Vojislavljević

Annotations

References

Sources
Primary sources

 
 
 
 

Secondary sources

 
 
 
 
 
 
 
 
 
 
 

|-

11th-century Serbian royalty
11th-century Serbian monarchs
11th-century Byzantine people
Rulers of Duklja
Byzantine rebels
Prisoners and detainees of the Byzantine Empire
Byzantine people of Slavic descent
Vojislavljević dynasty
Medieval rebels
Byzantine Serbia
Byzantine Dalmatia
Christian monarchs